Interstate 585 (I-585) is a  auxiliary Interstate Highway of I-85 in the US state of South Carolina. It is an orphan auxiliary route to I-85 since 1995 when the Interstate was relocated further north bypassing Spartanburg. In a concurrency with US Highway 176 (US 176) throughout, it spurs south from I-85 Business (I-85 Bus) for a couple of miles before entering the downtown area.

Route description
I-585 is cosigned the entire length with US 176 and it uses US 176's exit number system instead of its own. The route is also signed as North Pine Street its entire length. The southern terminus begins at exit 25, where the road continues as US 176/South Carolina Highway 9 (SC 9). I-585 remains concurrent with US 176 starting at exit 25 as it heads northwest. It then comes across a partial interchange with California Avenue at exit 24. Before exit 23, there are two at-grade auxiliary lanes, one on each side which connects Milliken Road on the north side and Graham Road on the south side to the highway. At exit 23, the highway comes across I-85 Bus, forming a parclo interchange, ending just north of it. US 176 continues west to I-85.

History

From the highway's initial designation until 1995, I-85 followed what is now designated I-85 Bus. In that year, I-85 moved to the north, orphaning I-585 from a direct connection to its parent route, a situation that remained until upgrades to US 176 over the next decade provided a freeway connection between I-85 and I-85 Bus, except for a stoplight at Upper Valley Falls Rd/Fairforest Rd. Additionally, US 176 is connected to I-85 with a stoplight-controlled diamond interchange instead of a freeway-to-freeway interchange.

Exit list
Exit numbers, where present, are based on US 176 mileage.

Interstate 585 Business

Interstate 585 Business (I-585 Bus) was a boulevard-grade business route of I-585 along Pine Street, between Whitney Road (US 221) and St. John Street (US 29). It traveled concurrently with US 176 and SC 9. Sometime between 2000 and 2012, the route was removed, with no current state or federal maps listing it nor any physical signage.

See also

References

External links

I-585 at Virginia Highways' South Carolina Highways Annex
I-585 Bus at Virginia Highways' South Carolina Highways Annex
I-585 at SouthEastRoads.com
I-585 at Interstate-Guide.com
Interstate 585 (3 Digit Interstates)

85-5
85-5
5
Transportation in Spartanburg County, South Carolina